CRS may refer to:

Organisations

Government related 

 Career Retention Specialist, a Marine responsible for enlisted retention in U.S. Marine Corps units
 China Reconstruction Society, also known as the Blue Shirts Society, a Fascist clique and secret police or para-military force in the Republic of China between 1931 and 1938
 Commission of Railway Safety, rail safety authority in India
 Common Reporting Standard, an OECD standard for exchange of information
 Community Relations Service, United States Department of Justice branch for CR and civil rights
 Compagnies Républicaines de Sécurité, the French riot-control force
 Congressional Research Service, the public-policy arm of the United States Congress

NGO or commercial 

 Catholic Relief Services, an American international humanitarian agency
 Center for Resource Solutions, a nonprofit public agency in the United States
 Classic Rock Society, a UK-based organisation to promote classic and progressive rock music
 Co-operative Retail Services, a former co-operative society in the United Kingdom
 Creation Research Society, a Christian research group which engages in creation science
 Croatian Register of Shipping, an independent classification society working in the marine market
 Somaschi Fathers (Ordo Clericorum Regularium a Somascha), a charitable religious congregation

Science and technology

Medicine and biology 
 Cambridge Reference Sequence, used in mitochondrial DNA testing
 Caudal regression syndrome, a rare congenital disorder
 Chinese restaurant syndrome, purportedly caused by the flavor enhancer glutamate
 Chronic rhinosinusitis
 Congenital rubella syndrome, a disease passed from mother to fetus
 Cutaneous radiation syndrome, a syndrome that results from acute radiation exposure to the skin
 Cytokine release syndrome, in immunology
 Cytoreductive surgery, in cancer treatment

Computer science and engineering 
 Canada Remote Systems, a now-defunct bulletin-board system based in Toronto
 Carrier Routing System, a large-scale core router
 Cluster Ready Services, components of Oracle Clusterware for database support
 Cold rolled steel
 Commercial Resupply Services, a NASA contract to deliver supplies to space
 Common reference string model, in cryptography
 Computer reservations system (or Central Reservation System), a computerised system used for travel bookings
 Coordinate reference system, used to locate geographical entities

Other uses 

 Camp Rising Sun (New York), an international leadership-program for youth development
 Child Rebel Soldier, a hip-hop supergroup composed of Kanye West, Lupe Fiasco, and Pharrell
 Classroom response system, an interactive teaching tool using "clicker questions"
 Seychellois Creole (ISO 639-3 language code), a French-based creole language of the Seychelles
 Colorado Revised Statutes, the legal code of Colorado
 Cosmic Ray Subsystem, a spacecraft instrument on the Voyager probe that helped detect the interstellar medium
 Consumer Recreation Services, a fictional company which features in the 1997 film The Game

See also 

 .crs (disambiguation)
 CRS-1 (disambiguation)

Distinguish from 
seeress, a female prophet